Joseph Stinson (also known as Joseph C. Stinson) is an American screenwriter best known for such films as City Heat, Stick and Sudden Impact.

References

External links

American male screenwriters
Living people
Year of birth missing (living people)